Dobrolet, Russia or Dobrolot is a village in Irkutsky District, on the Goloustenskiy Trakt (Голоустенский тракт) located west of Lake Baikal in the Irkutsk Oblast, in eastern Siberia,  Russia.

References

Rural localities in Irkutsk Oblast